Niclas Nøhr (born 2 August 1991) is a Danish badminton player, specializing in doubles play. He started playing badminton at Møn badminton club. In 2012, he joined Denmark national badminton team, and in 2015, he won a gold medal at the European Games with his partner in mixed doubles Sara Thygesen.

After one year of a knee operation he is back in track. "I'm just happy that my family, friends, and especially my girlfriend has supported me in such a hard time."

Achievements

European Games 
Mixed doubles

European Championships 
Mixed doubles

European Junior Championships 
Boys' doubles

BWF World Tour (2 titles, 3 runners-up) 
The BWF World Tour, which was announced on 19 March 2017 and implemented in 2018, is a series of elite badminton tournaments sanctioned by the Badminton World Federation (BWF). The BWF World Tour is divided into levels of World Tour Finals, Super 1000, Super 750, Super 500, Super 300 (part of the HSBC World Tour), and the BWF Tour Super 100.

Mixed doubles

BWF Grand Prix (1 runner-up) 
The BWF Grand Prix had two levels, the Grand Prix and Grand Prix Gold. It was a series of badminton tournaments sanctioned by the Badminton World Federation (BWF) and played between 2007 and 2017.

Mixed doubles

  BWF Grand Prix Gold tournament
  BWF Grand Prix tournament

BWF International Challenge/Series 
Men's doubles

Mixed doubles

  BWF International Challenge tournament
  BWF International Series tournament
  BWF Future Series tournament

References

External links 
 

1991 births
Living people
People from Møn
Danish male badminton players
Badminton players at the 2015 European Games
Badminton players at the 2019 European Games
European Games gold medalists for Denmark
European Games medalists in badminton
Sportspeople from Region Zealand